Steppenwolf 7 is the fifth studio album by Canadian-American rock band Steppenwolf. The album was released in November 1970, by Dunhill Records. It is the first Steppenwolf album with new bass player George Biondo. The album’s numerical title reflects the fact that it was the band’s seventh album release for ABC/Dunhill records (including the four preceding studio LP’s, as well as two live albums).
While the album featured Steppenwolf's trademark rock and roll sounds, none of the songs were able to make the top 40. The album featured a cover of Hoyt Axton's "Snowblind Friend", their second cover of one of his antidrug songs (the first being "The Pusher"). Along with "Who Needs Ya", it was one of two singles from the album which made the charts, but fell short of the top 40. The album track "Renegade" is autobiographical for lead vocalist John Kay, recounting his flight with his mother from the Soviet occupation zone to the West in 1948. The intro to "Earschplittenloudenboomer" is spoken by Kay partially in German.

Track listing
All tracks composed by John Kay and Larry Byrom; except where indicated.

Personnel

Steppenwolf
 John Kay – lead vocals, rhythm guitar, harmonica
 Larry Byrom – lead guitar, backing vocals
 Goldy McJohn – Hammond organ, piano
 George Biondo – bass, backing vocals, lead vocals on "Fat Jack" and co-lead vocals on "Foggy Mental Breakdown" and "Who Needs Ya'"
 Jerry Edmonton – drums

Technical
 Richard Podolor – producer, engineer
 Bill Cooper – engineer
 Tom Gundelfinger – photography
 Gary Burden – art direction, liner design, artwork

Charts

Singles - Billboard (United States)

References

1970 albums
Steppenwolf (band) albums
Albums produced by Richard Podolor
Dunhill Records albums